The UAAP Season 82 basketball tournaments were the University Athletic Association of the Philippines (UAAP) basketball tournaments for the 2019–20 school year.

Jensen Ilagan, the technical director of the regional ASEAN Basketball League was appointed commissioner for the season's basketball tournaments on August 6, 2019.

The senior men's and women's tournaments began on September 4, 2019, while the juniors' division which was sub-hosted by National University held their opening games on November 13 for the boys' tournament and on January 11, 2020 for the newly formed girls' competition.

The men's defending champions Ateneo Blue Eagles won all 14 elimination round games to become the only second men's basketball team to advance to the UAAP Finals outright (after UE in 2007). The remaining Final Four teams figured in the stepladder format to determine Ateneo's finals opponent. UST defeated FEU in the first round to meet UP in the second round, who are holding their first twice-to-beat advantage in the Final Four era. The Growling Tigers defeated the Fighting Maroons twice to deny UP's finals rematch against Ateneo and become the lowest-seeded basketball team in UAAP history to have competed in the championship round.

In the first #1 vs #4 UAAP Finals match-up in any of the league's events, the Blue Eagles swept the finals for a second consecutive year, being crowned undefeated champions (and the first men's basketball team in UAAP history to pose a 16–0 season win sweep record). Graduating player Thirdy Ravena became the first athlete in UAAP history to win three consecutive Finals MVP awards.

The women's defending champions NU Lady Bulldogs also won all elimination round games. In the stepladder, FEU outlasted Adamson in the first round, to meet #2 seeded UST in the next round. UST needed its twice-to-beat advantage to eliminate the Lady Tamaraws from contention. The Tigresses fell short against the NU Lady Bulldogs, who were without their best player Jack Animam, who was injured. The Lady Bulldogs won their sixth consecutive title, all undefeated seasons.

The juniors' division introduced a girls' tournament, a demonstration sport. The boys' defending champions, the NSNU Bullpups, finished the elimination round undefeated. Last year's finalist, the Ateneo Blue Eaglets, were defeated by the Adamson Baby Falcons in the first round of the stepladder. FEU arranged a Finals match-up with the Bullpups after beating the Baby Falcons in the second round. The Bullpups finished the season undefeated though, winning both Finals games.

The inaugural girls' tournament featured four teams, with the top 2 teams qualifying to the Finals. The Adamson Lady Baby Falcons finished the elimination round undefeated, while the UST Junior Tigresses fended off the DLSZ Lady Junior Archers in their last elimination round game to qualify to the Finals. The two teams split the first two Finals games, with the second game held behind closed doors due to the COVID-19 pandemic. The UAAP then canceled the tournament, declaring both teams co-champions.

Teams
All eight member universities of the UAAP fielded teams in all two divisions. Only four high schools fielded in teams for the inaugural girls' basketball tournament.

Coaches
The UE Red Warriors' Lawrence Chongson and the De La Salle Green Archers' Jermaine Byrd were both recognized by the UAAP as active consultants of their respective teams. Gian Nazario who had been listed by La Salle as their coach clarified that the school is yet to make an announcement regarding Byrd's official appointment. Bong Tan, who had replaced Joe Silva as coach explained the unique setup in their team. With Chongson as consultant, he is able to trust him and take a backseat during games.

Tan died on November 11, 2019. It was reported that he had collapsed while playing in a basketball game in Mandaluyong.

Coaching changes

Venues
The Mall of Asia Arena in Pasay and the Smart Araneta Coliseum in Quezon City are the primary venues for the men's tournament, and the venues for the Finals series for the women's tournament. The Ynares Center in Antipolo is an alternative venue for the men's tournament. The Quadricentennial Pavilion in UST Manila and the Blue Eagle Gym in Quezon City are the alternate and main venue for the women's and boys' tournaments, respectively.

The girls tournament is held at the Paco Arena in Manila.

Men's tournament

Elimination round

Team standings

Match-up results

Scores
Results on top and to the right of the dashes are for first-round games; those to the bottom and to the left of it are second-round games.

Bracket

Stepladder semifinals

First round
This is a single-elimination game. FEU sustains the current longest playoffs streak, appearing in all playoffs since 2013. For UST, this is their first playoffs appearance since their 2015 runner-up finish.

UST led by 26 at halftime. Ken Tuffin led an FEU scoring run in the third quarter that cut the lead to 10. Rhenz Abando and Renzo Subido scored back-to-back three-pointers to end the third quarter with UST up by 14. FEU then again had 9–0 run to cut the lead to five, but Subido and Soulemane Chabi Yo scored eight points together to put the Tigers up for good. Tuffin and Xyrus Torres cut the lead 78–71 but that was the closest the Tamaraws can get.

Second round
The UP Fighting Maroons have a twice-to-beat advantage. This is UP's second consecutive playoffs appearance, and the first time they have the twice-to-beat advantage.

UST, which has never lost to UP this season, led 19–13 in the first quarter, with Renzo Subido and Rhenz Abando converting multiple three-pointers. Abando and CJ Cansino scored for the Tigers in the second quarter, to extend the lead to 18. Trailing at halftime 41–24, Juan Gomez de Liaño scored seven consecutive points to cut the lead to 12, but he injured his ankle, and the Tigers had another run to lead 52–33. Bright Akhuetie and the return of Gomez de Liaño cut the deficit to 11, but UST closed out the quarter scoring on each of its possessions to lead 60–47. UP cut the lead again to 11, but Sherwin Concepcion and Mark Nonoy made back-to-back three pointers to put UST up for good, extending the series to a deciding Game 2.

UST started the deciding Game 2 the same way Game 1 started, making a double-digit lead, and limiting UP to just 6 points after the first quarter. The Fighting Maroons outscored the Tigers in the second quarter though to cut the lead to one point at halftime. In the fourth quarter, UP led for the first time in the series, off a Gomez de Liaño jump-shot, and extended the lead further off a Jun Manzo lay-up. Akhuetie then suffered from cramps, that led to Manzo fouling a UST player to stop the clock; it was his fifth and he was disqualified from the game. UP led by four just after the two-minute warning off a Kobe Paras slam dunk, but Abando scored on a fast-break to cut the lead to a single possession. Ricci Rivero missed on a lay-up for UP, Renzo Subido made a three-pointer to give UST the lead for good, and the Tigers advance to the Finals.

Finals
This is a best-of-three playoff. This is Ateneo's fourth consecutive Finals appearance, and their first after winning all elimination round games. This is UST's first Finals appearance since their 2015 runner-up finish vs. FEU.

 Finals Most Valuable Player: 
Ateneo started Game 1 on an 18–2 run and never looked back to take a wire-to-wire victory. A UST scoring run led by Mark Nonoy cut the lead to two in the second quarter, but that's the closest the Tigers could get as Ateneo had its own 13–1 to end the first half. Ateneo increased its lead to 23 in the third quarter, and Nonoy's back-to-back three-pointers in the fourth period were canceled out by Angelo Kouame and Matt Nieto's baskets. Thirdy Ravena scored a season-high 32 points, Kouame had 18 points and 12 rebounds, and SJ Belangel scored 12 for Ateneo, who shot 52.05% from the field as a team.

Awards

 
 Most Valuable Player: 
 Rookie of the Year: 
 Mythical Team:
 
 
 
 
 
 PSBankable Player of the Season: 
 AXA Know You Can Player of the Season:

Players of the Week

Statistics

Players' statistical points

Season player highs

Game player highs

Game team highs

Season team highs

Broadcast notes
ABS-CBN Sports is the last broadcaster of the UAAP Season 82 Men's Basketball games to aired on S+A and Liga the network was a 20 years of UAAP games. However, their contract with the network's sports division expired and leaved in jeopardy, due to the issue of legislative franchise renewal and the denial of the franchise, which leads to the sports division's dissolution following their retrenchment on August 31, 2020. As of October 21, 2020, the league chose Cignal TV/One Sports as a new partner to air the UAAP games next season.

Women's tournament
The NU Lady Bulldogs won their 96th straight match when they annexed their sixth straight championship on November 23, 2019.

The UST Growling Tigresses ended a 13-year finals drought when they defeated the FEU Lady Tamaraws in the second round of the stepladder semifinals on November 16. UST has been eliminated in the semifinals for two years in Seasons 80 and 81, and were defeated in the fourth-seed playoff the previous year. The Tigresses last qualified for the finals in Season 69, under coach Peque Tan and league MVP Marichu Bacaro, when coach Haydee Ong was still handling Ateneo.

The UP Lady Maroons ended their 38-game losing streak when they defeated University of the East in the second round of eliminations on October 12, 2019. Graduating player Pat Pesquera's three-point attempt from the halfcourt line went in before the buzzer sounded for a 55–52 lead, effectively avoiding an overtime period.

Elimination round

Team standings

Match-up results

Scores
Results on top and to the right of the dashes are for first-round games; those to the bottom and to the left of it are second-round games.

Bracket

Stepladder semifinals

First round
This is a single-elimination game.

Second round
The UST Growling Tigresses have a twice-to-beat advantage.

Finals 
This is a best-of-three playoff.

Finals Most Valuable Player: Monique Allison del Carmen (NU Lady Bulldogs)

Awards

 Most Valuable Player: 
 Rookie of the Year: 
 Mythical Team:

Players of the Week

Statistics

Players' statistical points

Season player highs

Game player highs

Game team highs

Season team highs

Boys' tournament

Elimination round

Team standings

Match-up results

Scores
Results on top and to the right of the dashes are for first-round games; those to the bottom and to the left of it are second-round games.

Bracket

Stepladder semifinals

First round 
This is a single-elimination game.

Second round 
FEU Baby Tamaraws have a twice-to-beat advantage.

Finals 
This is a best-of-three playoff.

Finals Most Valuable Player:

Awards

 Most Valuable Player: 
 Rookie of the Year: 
 Mythical Five:

Girls' tournament

Elimination round

Team standings

Match-up results

Scores
Results on top and to the right of the dashes are for first-round games; those to the bottom and to the left of it are second-round games.

Finals 
This is a best-of-three playoff.

Awards

 Most Valuable Player: 
 Mythical Five:

Overall championship points

Seniors' division 

In case of a tie, the team with the higher position in any tournament is ranked higher. If both are still tied, they are listed by alphabetical order.

How rankings are determined:
 Ranks 5th to 8th determined by elimination round standings.
 Loser of the #1 vs #4 semifinal match-up is ranked 4th
 If stepladder: Loser of stepladder semifinals round 1 is ranked 4th
 Loser of the #2 vs #3 semifinal match-up is ranked 3rd
 If stepladder: Loser of stepladder semifinals round 2 is ranked 3rd
 Loser of the finals is ranked 2nd
 Champion is ranked 1st

See also 
 NCAA Season 95 basketball tournaments

Notes

References 

Basketball
UAAP basketball tournaments
2019–20 in Philippine college basketball
Basketball events curtailed due to the COVID-19 pandemic